Woodleigh is a rural locality in the Toowoomba Region, Queensland, Australia.

History
Cattle Gully State School  opened in June 1910. In 1924, it was renamed Woodleighton State School. It closed in 1961. It was at 590 Quinalow Woodleigh Road.

References 

Toowoomba Region
Localities in Queensland